U. R. Pradeep is a politician from Kerala and was an MLA for the Chelakkara assembly constituency. He is a member of the Communist Party of India (Marxist).

References

Year of birth missing (living people)
Living people
Communist Party of India (Marxist) politicians from Kerala
People from Thrissur district